Panchaganga Express is an Express train belonging to South Western Railway zone that runs between  and  in India via Shortest possible Padil Bypass route. It is currently being operated with 16595/16596 train numbers on a daily basis. From May 13, 2023 it will be converted as Superfast Express with new train numbers 20661/20662

Train is named after Gangavali river near Kumta and Ankola of Uttara Kannada and Panchagangavalli river of udupi districts.

This train runs between KSR and Karwar as 16595/16596 Panchaganga Express. It is widely considered that train which changed the way people travel in coastal Karnataka.  
Bypassing Mangalore city is one of the major reason for trains tremendous success as it saves minimum 4 hours travel time of commuters. 

Few Passengers were asking railway board to operated this train as a single train by connecting Madgaon with Bangalore. Also Bangalore people gets one more daily train to Madgaon.But Railway board outrightly rejected this demand and said this train is dedicated to people of Karnataka coastal and not beyond that.
Also Karwar Madgaon special express is an important train to connect Karwar with Madgao hence no point of converting it as single train it said.

Service

The 16595/KSR Bengaluru City–Karwar Panchaganga Express  covers 673 km in 14h 35m. The 16596/Karwar–KSR Bengaluru Express/Panchaganga Express covers 674 km in 15h 15m.

Route and halts 

The important halts of the train are:

 
 
 
 
 
 Bantwal (BC Road)

Coach composition

The train has standard LHB rakes with a max speed of 130 km/h. The train consists of 14 coaches:

 1 AC I Cum AC II Tier
 1 AC II Tier
 1 AC III Tier
 7 Sleeper coaches
 2 General Unreserved
 1 Luggage Cum Disabled Coach
 1 Generator Coach

Traction
It hauled by Krishnarajapuram based WDP-4 or WDP-4B or WDP-4D on its entire journey.

See also 

 Bangalore City railway station
 Karwar railway station
 Yesvantpur–Karwar Express
 Madgaon railway station

References

External links 

 16523/KSR Bengaluru City–Karwar Express India Rail Info
 16524/Karwar–KSR Bengaluru City Express India Rail Info

Transport in Karwar
Transport in Bangalore
Express trains in India
Rail transport in Karnataka
Railway services introduced in 2012